The 2020 Kosovar Supercup was the 29th edition of the Kosovar Supercup, an annual football match played between the winners of the previous season's Kosovo Superleague and Kosovar Cup competitions. The match was played between Drita, champions of the 2019–20 Kosovo Superleague and Prishtina, who beat their opponents to win the 2019–20 Kosovar Cup Final. Prishtina won the match 3–1 and claimed their 10th Supercup title.

Match

Details

See also
2019–20 Football Superleague of Kosovo
2019–20 Kosovar Cup
FC Drita–FC Prishtina rivalry

Notes and references

Notes

References

Kosovar Supercup
Supercup
International club association football competitions hosted by Turkey